Hermidio Barrantes Cascante (born 2 September 1964 in Puntarenas) is a retired Costa Rican football goalkeeper.

Club career
He made his senior debut for Puntarenas on 20 November 1983 against Ramonense and also played for Herediano, Cartaginés and Santa Bárbara before joining Deportivo Saprissa as their second goalkeeper behind José Francisco Porras, after an injury ruled out regular starting goalie Erick Lonnis. He finished his career at Limonense and played 396 matches in the Costa Rica Premier Division.

International career
Barrantes made his debut for Costa Rica in a February 1989 friendly match against Poland and has earned a total of 38 caps, scoring no goals. He has represented his country in 12 FIFA World Cup qualification matches and was part of the national team that played in the 1990 FIFA World Cup held in Italy and featured in the final of the squad's four games played. He was understudy to Luis Conejo in the three group games, but Conejo's injury allowed Barrantes to step in against Czechoslovakia. He was blamed by some fans for Costa Rica's heavy defeat and received death threats on his return home.

He also played at the 1991 and 1997 UNCAF Nations Cups as well as at the 2000 CONCACAF Gold Cup and the 1997 Copa América.

He played his final international on February 20, 2000 against Trinidad & Tobago.

Personal life
Barrantes is married to Ana Cristina Baltodano and the couple have three sons: Hermidio, Diego Andrés and Carlos Daniel. They live in Desamparados. After retiring, he worked for the Costa Rican Electricity Institute (ICE ) in the Department of Business Services.

References

External links
 

1964 births
Living people
People from Puntarenas
Association football goalkeepers
Costa Rican footballers
Costa Rica international footballers
1990 FIFA World Cup players
1997 Copa América players
2000 CONCACAF Gold Cup players
Puntarenas F.C. players
C.S. Herediano footballers
C.S. Cartaginés players
Deportivo Saprissa players
Copa Centroamericana-winning players